The Rascal King may refer to:
 James Michael Curley, a Boston politician
 The Rascal King (song), a song inspired by Curley by the Mighty Mighty Bosstones